Kopeikin or Kopeykin is a Russian masculine surname, its feminine counterpart is Kopeikina or Kopeykina. It may refer to
Alexei Kopeikin (born 1983), Russian ice hockey forward 
Boris Kopeikin (born 1946), Russian football player 
Sergei Kopeikin (born 1956), American theoretical physicist 

Russian-language surnames